These are lists of the largest airlines in North America, ranked by several different metrics.

By passengers carried

This is a list of North America's largest passenger airlines in terms of enplaned passengers. Passenger numbers shown are inclusive of regional carriers operating under contract where applicable.

Notes
 Numbers on and after 2013 are for the merged American/US Airways
 Numbers on and after 2016 are for the merged Alaska/Virgin America
 For nine months ending September 2019

By fleet size
This is a list of airlines ranked by fleet size (including regional partners), :

By number of destinations
This is a list of airlines ranked by number of destinations, :

By frequency
This is a list of airlines ranked by daily flights (frequency):

See also
 World's largest airlines
 List of largest airlines in Europe
 List of largest airlines in Central America & the Caribbean
 List of largest airlines in Africa
 List of largest airlines in Asia
 List of largest airlines in South America
 List of largest airlines in Oceania

References 

North America
Airlines of North America
 Largest